Israel Moiseevich Gelfand, also written Israïl Moyseyovich Gel'fand, or Izrail M. Gelfand (– 5 October 2009) was a prominent Soviet-American mathematician. He made significant contributions to many branches of mathematics, including group theory, representation theory and functional analysis. The recipient of many awards, including the Order of Lenin and the first Wolf Prize, he was a Foreign Fellow of the Royal Society and professor at Moscow State University and, after immigrating to the United States shortly before his 76th birthday, at Rutgers University. Gelfand is also a 1994 MacArthur Fellow.

His legacy continues through his students, who include Endre Szemerédi, Alexandre Kirillov, Edward Frenkel, Joseph Bernstein, David Kazhdan, as well as his own son, Sergei Gelfand.

Early years
A native of Kherson Governorate, Russian Empire (now, Odessa Oblast, Ukraine), Gelfand was born into a Jewish family in the small southern Ukrainian town of Okny. According to his own account, Gelfand was expelled from high school under the Soviets because his father had been a mill owner. Bypassing both high school and college, he proceeded to postgraduate study at the age of 19 at Moscow State University, where his advisor was the preeminent mathematician Andrei Kolmogorov. He received his PhD in 1935.

Gelfand immigrated to the United States in 1989.

Work
Gelfand is known for many developments including:

 the book Calculus of Variations (1963), which he co-authored with Sergei Fomin;
  Gelfand's formula, which expresses the spectral radius as a limit of matrix norms.
 the Gelfand representation in Banach algebra theory;
 the Gelfand–Mazur theorem in Banach algebra theory;
 the Gelfand–Naimark theorem;
 the Gelfand–Naimark–Segal construction;
 Gelfand–Shilov spaces;
 the Gelfand–Pettis integral;
 the representation theory of the complex classical Lie groups;
 contributions to the theory of Verma modules in the representation theory of semisimple Lie algebras (with I. N. Bernstein and S. I. Gelfand);
 contributions to distribution theory and measures on infinite-dimensional spaces;
 the first observation of the connection of automorphic forms with representations (with Sergei Fomin);
 conjectures about the Atiyah–Singer index theorem;
 ordinary differential equations (Gelfand–Levitan theory);
 work on calculus of variations and soliton theory (Gelfand–Dikii equations);
 contributions to the philosophy of cusp forms;
 Gelfand–Fuchs cohomology of Lie algebras;
 Gelfand–Kirillov dimension;
 integral geometry;
 combinatorial definition of the Pontryagin class;
 Coxeter functors;
 general hypergeometric functions;
 Gelfand–Tsetlin patterns;
 Gelfand-Lokutsievski method;
 and many other results, particularly in the representation theory of classical groups.

Gelfand ran a seminar at Moscow State University from 1945(?) until May 1989 (when it continued at Rutgers University), which covered a wide range of topics and was an important school for many mathematicians.

Influence outside mathematics
The Gelfand–Tsetlin (also spelled Zetlin) basis is a widely used tool in theoretical physics and the result of Gelfand's work on the representation theory of the unitary group and Lie groups in general.

Gelfand also published works on biology and medicine. For a long time he took an interest in cell biology and organized a research seminar on the subject.

He worked extensively in mathematics education, particularly with correspondence education. In 1994, he was awarded a MacArthur Fellowship for this work.

Personal life

Gelfand was married to Zorya Shapiro, and their two sons, Sergei and Vladimir both live in the United States. The third son, Aleksandr, died of leukemia. Following the divorce from his first wife, Gelfand married his second wife, Tatiana; together they had a daughter, Tatiana. The family also includes four grandchildren and three great-grandchildren. Memories about I. Gelfand are collected at a dedicated website handled by his family.

Gelfand was an advocate of animal rights. He became a vegetarian in 1994 and vegan in 2000.

Honors and awards
Gelfand held several honorary degrees and was awarded the Order of Lenin three times for his research. In 1977 he was elected a Foreign Member of the Royal Society. He won the Wolf Prize in 1978, Kyoto Prize in 1989 and MacArthur Foundation Fellowship in 1994. He held the presidency of the Moscow Mathematical Society between 1968 and 1970, and was elected a foreign member of the U.S. National Academy of Science, the American Academy of Arts and Sciences, the Royal Irish Academy, the American Mathematical Society and the London Mathematical Society.

In an October 2003 article in The New York Times, written on the occasion of his 90th birthday, Gelfand is described as a scholar who is considered "among the greatest mathematicians of the 20th century", having exerted a tremendous influence on the field both through his own works and those of his students.

Death
Gelfand died at the Robert Wood Johnson University Hospital near his home in Highland Park, New Jersey. He was less than five weeks past his 96th birthday. His death was first reported on the blog of his former collaborator Andrei Zelevinsky and confirmed a few hours later by an obituary in the Russian online newspaper Polit.ru.

Publications

Generalized Functions Volumes, 1-6, American Math Society, (2015)

See also
Gelfand duality
Gelfand-Levitan-Marchenko equation
Gelfand pair
Gelfand mapping
Gelfand ring
Gelfand triple
Anti-cosmopolitan campaign

References

Citations

Sources 

Chang, Kenneth. "Israel Gelfand, Math Giant, Dies at 96", The New York Times (October 7, 2009)
"Leading mathematician Israel Gelfand dies in N.J." USA Today (October 9, 2009)
"Israel Gelfand | Top mathematician, 96". The Philadelphia Inquirer (October 10, 2009)
"Israel Gelfand" The Daily Telegraph (October 27, 2009)

External links
Israel Moiseevich Gelfand, dedicated site, maintained by Tatiana V. Gelfand and Tatiana I. Gelfand
Israel Gelfand - Daily Telegraph obituary
Israel Gelfand - Guardian obituary

Web page at Rutgers
List of publications.
Steele Prize citation.
The unity of mathematics – In honor of the ninetieth birthday of I. M. Gelfand
Interview: "A talk with professor I. M. Gelfand.", recorded by V. Retakh and A. Sosinsky, Kvant (1989), no. 1, 3–12 (in Russian). English translation in: Quantum (1991), no. 1, 20–26. (Link)

1913 births
2009 deaths
People from Odesa Oblast
People from Ananyevsky Uyezd
Ukrainian Jews
Soviet Jews
Soviet emigrants to the United States
American people of Ukrainian-Jewish descent
Operator theorists
Soviet biologists
Functional analysts
Textbook writers
Fluid dynamicists
Ukrainian mathematicians
Mathematical analysts
Soviet mathematicians
20th-century biologists
20th-century American mathematicians
21st-century American mathematicians
People from Highland Park, New Jersey
Moscow State University alumni
Full Members of the USSR Academy of Sciences
Full Members of the Russian Academy of Sciences
Members of the French Academy of Sciences
Members of the Royal Irish Academy
Kyoto laureates in Basic Sciences
Foreign associates of the National Academy of Sciences
Foreign Members of the Royal Society
MacArthur Fellows
Stalin Prize winners
Lenin Prize winners
Recipients of the Order of Friendship of Peoples
Recipients of the Order of Lenin
Recipients of the Order of the Red Banner of Labour
State Prize of the Russian Federation laureates
Wolf Prize in Mathematics laureates
Members of the Royal Swedish Academy of Sciences